USS Fentress (AK-180/T-AK-180) was an  acquired by the US Navy during the final months of World War II. In 1950, she was reactivated and placed into service with the Military Sea Transportation Service as USNS Fentress. She was ultimately transferred to the Trust Territory of the Pacific Islands and the Republic of the Marshall Islands.

Construction
Fentress was launched on 10 March 1945, by Kaiser Cargo, Inc., Richmond, California, under a Maritime Commission contract, MC hull 2376; sponsored by Mrs. G. M. Ellis; and commissioned 4 May 1945.

Service history

World War II-related service
After shakedown and availability, Fentress engaged in local operations until 27 June 1945 when she departed San Francisco, California, to transport cargo among the Philippine Islands. On 20 February 1946 she was placed out of commission and returned to the U.S. Maritime Commission.

Service with the MSTS
After the organization of the Military Sea Transportation Service (MSTS), Fentress was reacquired on 1 July 1950 for service.

Merchant service
Fentress was struck from the Navy List on 15 October 1973 and transferred to the Government of the Trust Territory of the Pacific Islands on 20 July 1974.

On 4 July 1982, she was transferred permanently to the Republic of the Marshall Islands.

This ship was apparently still docked on the Hawaiian Islands in 1982, as it was seen on the Magnum P.I. episode, "I do".

The ship was scrapped in 1985.

Notes 

Citations

Bibliography 

Online resources

External links

Alamosa-class cargo ships
Fentress County, Tennessee
Ships built in Richmond, California
1945 ships
World War II auxiliary ships of the United States
Ships transferred from the United States Navy to the Trust Territory of the Pacific Islands